Meshir, also known as Mechir (Mekhír) and Amshir, is the sixth month of the ancient Egyptian and Coptic calendars. It lies between February 8 and March 9 of the Gregorian calendar. The month of Meshir is also the second month of the Season of Proyet (Growth and Emergence) in ancient Egypt, when the Nile floods recede and the crops start to grow throughout the land of Egypt.

Name
The name of the month of Meshir comes from Mechir, the Ancient Egyptian God genius of wind .

Coptic Synaxarium of the month of Meshir

References

Citations

Bibliography
 Synaxarium of the month of Amshir

Months of the Coptic calendar
Egyptian calendar